Hindōḷaṃ is a rāgam in Carnatic music (musical scale of South Indian classical music). It is an audava rāgam (or owdava rāgam, meaning pentatonic scale). It is a janya rāgam (derived scale), as it does not have all the seven swaras (musical notes). Hindolam is not the same as the Hindustani Hindol. The equivalent of Hindolam in Hindustani music is Malkauns (or Malkosh).

It is known to be a rāgam that is generally beautiful and soothing to listen to. Being symmetrical in its ascending and descending scales, it lends itself very well to improvisation and is therefore popular at concerts.

Structure and Lakshana

Hindōḷaṃ is a symmetric rāgam that does not contain rishabham and panchamam. It is a pentatonic scale (audava-audava rāgam in Carnatic music classification—audava means 'of 5'). Since pentatonic scales can be found in other world music such as Chinese music, shades of Mohanam and Hindōḷaṃ can sometimes be traced in Chinese and east Asian music. Its  structure (ascending and descending scale) is as follows (see swaras in Carnatic music for details on below notation and terms):

 : 
 : 

This rāgam uses the swaras sadharana gandharam, shuddha madhyamam, shuddha dhaivatam and kaisiki nishadam. Hindolam is not a melakarta rāgam, since it does not contain all the seven swaras.

Experts in Carnatic music hold differences of opinion on the janaka rāgams (rāgams of origin) that should be attributed to Hindolam. It is widely accepted that the 20th melakarta, Natabhairavi, is the parent rāgam of Hindolam, but some would like to associate it with the 8th melakarta, Hanumatodi. It can be derived from both, by dropping the rishabham and panchamam.

Popular Compositions
Sāmajavara gamanā by the maestro Tyagaraja is one of the most popular compositions in Hindolam. Mamavatu śri Sarasvati by Mysore Vasudevachar is another popular composition. Here are some more kritis composed in Hindolam:
Samajavaragamana, Manasulōni Marmamulu and Gōvardhana Giridhāri by Tyagaraja
Madhukara Vritti,  Yaare Rangana, Avanavana Kayva, by Purandaradasa
Dasa Dasara Maneya By Kanakadasa
 Guru Purandara Dasare, Uma Kathyayani By Vijaya Dasa
Hari Sarvothama Vayu Jeevothama By Kamalesha Vittala Dasu
Gōvardhana Girīśam Smarāmi, Neerajakshi Kamakshi and Saraswati Vidhiyuvathi by Muthuswami Dikshitar 
Padmanabha Pāhi by Swathi Thirunal
Maa Ramanan, Sāma Gāna lolalane and Nambikettavar by Papanasam Sivan
Sadanandamayi Chinmayi by Oothukadu Venkata Kavi
Mamavatu Sri Saraswati by Mysore Vasudevacharya
Chintayami Jagadamba by Jayachamarajendra Wodeyar
Dēva Dēvaṃ Bhajē, Konḍalalō Nelakonna, Garuda Gamana, Narayana Ni Namame, Nigama Nigama Nigamandha by Annamacharya 
Ramanakku Mannan Mudi by Arunachala Kavi
Mal Marugan (varnam) by Thanjavur Shankara Iyer
Tillana (Dhim na naa tha dhirana)  by Balamuralikrishna

Numerous bhajans, stotras, kritis and film music numbers also have been composed in the Hindolam rāgam.

Tamil Film Songs

Non Film Songs

Kannada Film Songs

Related rāgams 
This section covers the theoretical and scientific aspect of this rāgam.

Hindolam's notes when shifted using Graha bhedam, yields 4 other major pentatonic rāgams, namely, Mohanam, Shuddha Saveri, Udayaravichandrika (also known as Shuddha Dhanyasi) and Madhyamavati. Graha bhedam is the step taken in keeping the relative note frequencies same, while shifting the shadjam to the next note in the rāgam. For more details and illustration of this concept refer Graha bhedam on Mohanam.

Scale similarities 
Saramati has an asymmetric scale, with the ascending scale of Natabhairavi, while the descending scale is same as Hindolam. Its  structure is S R2 G2 M1 P D1 N2 S : S N2 D1 M1 G2 S

Notes

References

Janya ragas